Proteuxoa heliosema is a moth of the family Noctuidae. It is found in the Australian Capital Territory, New South Wales, Queensland, South Australia, Victoria and Western Australia.

Larvae have been recorded feeding on Eucalyptus species, as well as Pennisetum clandestinum and various other grasses.

External links
Australian Faunal Directory

Proteuxoa
Moths of Australia
Moths described in 1902
Taxa named by Oswald Bertram Lower